Erykah Badu is an American recording artist and actress.

In 1997, Badu received six nominations and won three, Favorite Female Solo Single for "On & On", Favorite Female Solo Album for Baduizm and Best R&B/Soul or Rap Song of the Year for "On & On" at the Soul Train Lady of Soul Awards. In 1998, Badu received fourteen nominations and won eight, including Favorite R&B/Soul or Rap New Artist at the American Music Awards; Best Female R&B Vocal Performance for "On & On" and Best R&B Album for Baduizm at the Grammy Awards; Outstanding New Artist and Outstanding Female Artist at the NAACP Image Awards; Favorite Female Soul/R&B Single for "On & On", Favorite Female Soul/R&B Album for Baduizm and Favorite New R&B/Soul or Rap New Artist for "On & On" at the Soul Train Music Awards. 

In 2000, Badu received two nominations and won one, Best Rap Performance by a Duo or Group at the Grammy Awards. In 2003, Badu received twelve nominations and won two, including Video of the Year for "Love of My Life (An Ode to Hip-Hop)" at the BET Awards and Best Urban/Alternative Performance for "Love of My Life (An Ode to Hip-Hop)" at the Grammy Awards. In 2008, Badu received eleven nominations and won two, including Best Director for "Honey" at the BET Awards and Best Direction in a Video for "Honey" at the MTV Video Music Awards. Overall, Badu has won 16 awards from 59 nominations.

American Music Awards
The American Music Awards is an annual awards ceremony created by Dick Clark in 1973. Badu has won one award from two nominations.

|-
|rowspan="2"|1998
|Baduizm
|Favorite Soul/R&B Album
|
|-
|Erykah Badu
|Favorite R&B/Soul or Rap New Artist
|

BET Awards
The BET Awards were established in 2001 by the Black Entertainment Television (BET) network. Badu has won two awards from seven nominations.

|-
|2001
|rowspan="2"|Erykah Badu
|Best Female R&B Artist
|
|-
|rowspan="4"|2003
|Best Female R&B Artist
|
|-
|rowspan="3"|"Love of My Life (An Ode to Hip-Hop)"
|Best Collaboration
|
|-
|Video of the Year
|
|-
|Viewer's Choice
|
|-
|rowspan="2"|2008
|"Honey"
|Video of the Year
|
|-
|Erykah Badu
|Best Video Director
|

BETJ Virtual Awards
The BETJ Virtual Awards is an annual awards ceremony to recognize jazz musicians. Badu has been nominated four times.

|-
|rowspan="4"|2008
|New Amerykah Part One (4th World War)
|Album of the Year
|
|-
|rowspan="2"|"Honey"
|Song of the Year
|
|-
|Virtual Video of the Year
|
|-
|Erykah Badu
|Live Performer of the Year
|

Black Reel Awards
The Black Reel Awards is an annual awards ceremony to recognize African Americans in feature, independent and television films. Badu has been nominated two times.

|-
|2000
|The Cider House Rules
|Best Supporting Actress
|
|-
|2003
|"Love of My Life (An Ode to Hip-Hop)"
|Best Original or Adapted Song
|

Grammy Awards
The Grammy Awards are awarded annually by the National Academy of Recording Arts and Sciences of the United States. Badu has won four awards from nineteen nominations.

|-
|rowspan="4"|1998
|Erykah Badu
|Best New Artist
|
|-
|rowspan="2"|"On & On"
|Best Female R&B Vocal Performance
|
|-
|Best Rhythm & Blues Song
|
|-
|Baduizm
|Best R&B Album
|
|-
|rowspan="2"|1999
|"Tyrone"
|Best Female R&B Vocal Performance
|
|-
|Live
|Best R&B Album
|
|-
|2000
|"You Got Me" (with The Roots and Eve)
|Best Rap Performance by a Duo or Group
|
|-
|rowspan="2"|2001
|rowspan="2"|"Bag Lady"
|Best Female R&B Vocal Performance
|
|-
|Best R&B Song
|
|-
|2002
|"Didn't Cha Know?"
|Best R&B Song
|
|-
|rowspan="3"|2003
|rowspan="3"|"Love of My Life (An Ode to Hip-Hop)" (featuring Common)
|Best Urban/Alternative Performance
|
|-
|Best R&B Song
|
|-
|Best Song Written for a Motion Picture, Television or Other Visual Media
|
|-
|rowspan="4"|2004
|"Back in the Day (Puff)"
|Best Female R&B Vocal Performance
|
|-
|rowspan="2"|"Danger"
|Best Urban/Alternative Performance
|
|-
|Best R&B Song
|
|-
|Worldwide Underground
|Best R&B Album
|
|-
|2007
|"That Heat" (with Sergio Mendes and will.i.am)
|Best Urban/Alternative Performance
|
|-
|2009
|"Honey"
|Best Short Form Music Video
|

MTV Video Music Awards
The MTV Video Music Awards is an annual awards ceremony established in 1984 by MTV. Badu has one awards from six nominations.

|-
|rowspan="2"|1997
|rowspan="2"|"On & On"
|Best Female Video
|
|-
|Best R&B Video
|
|-
|rowspan="4"|2008
|rowspan="4"|"Honey"
|Best Direction
|
|-
|Best Editing
|
|-
|Best Cinematography
|
|-
|Best Special Effects
|

NAACP Image Awards
The NAACP Image Awards is an award presented annually by the American National Association for the Advancement of Colored People to honor outstanding people of color in film, television, music and literature. Badu has won two awards from six nominations.

|-
|rowspan="2"|1998
|rowspan="2"|Erykah Badu
|Outstanding New Artist
|
|-
|Outstanding Female Artist
|
|-
|rowspan="4"|2003
|Erykah Badu & Common
|Outstanding Duo or Group
|
|-
|Erykah Badu
|Outstanding Female Artist
|
|-
|rowspan="2"|"Love of My Life (An Ode to Hip-Hop)"
|Outstanding Music Video
|
|-
|Outstanding Song
|

Soul Train Music Awards
The Soul Train Music Awards is an annual awards show that honors black musicians and entertainers. Badu has won three awards from five nominations.

|-
|rowspan="3"|1998
|Erykah Badu
|Best R&B/Soul or Rap New Artist
|
|-
|"On & On"
|Best R&B/Soul Single, Female
|
|-
|Baduizm
|Best R&B/Soul Album, Female
|
|-
|rowspan="3"|2010
|Erykah Badu
|Best R&B/Soul Artist, Female
|
|-
|New Amerykah Part Two (Return of the Ankh)
|Best R&B/Soul Album of the Year
|

Soul Train Lady of Soul Awards
The Soul Train Lady of Soul Awards is an awards show that honors the accomplishments of women in the music industry. Badu has won three awards from seven nominations.

|-
|rowspan="4"|1997
|Baduizm
|Favorite Female Solo Album
|
|-
|rowspan="2"|"On & On"
|Favorite Female Solo Single
|
|-
|Best R&B/Soul or Rap Song of the Year
|
|-
|"Next Lifetime"
|Best R&B/Soul or Rap Music Video
|
|-
|rowspan="3"|1998
|rowspan="2"|"Tyrone"
|Best R&B/Soul or Rap Song of the Year
|
|-
|Favorite Female Solo Single
|
|-
|Live
|R&B/Soul Album of the Year
|

Virgin Media Music Awards
Badu has been nominated once.

|-
|2008
|New Amerykah Part One (4th World War)
|Best Album Cover
|

References

Badu, Erykah
Awards And Nominations